Abū Yaḥyā ʿAbd al-Raḥīm ibn Muḥammad ibn Ismāʿīl al-Ḥudhakī al-Fāriqī, better known as Ibn Nubāta (d. 984/5), was an Islamic preacher celebrated for his sermons, active at the court of the Hamdanid emir of Aleppo, Sayf al-Dawla.

Life
Ibn Nubata was born in Mayyafariqin, but the date is not known. His medieval biographers assigned him a birth date of 946, but this is considered erroneous by modern historians. He was active at the court of the Hamdanid emir of Aleppo, Sayf al-Dawla, celebrated both as a warrior and patron of art and culture. The Aleppan court at the time attracted some of the most important intellectuals of the Arab world, and has been compared by modern historians with Renaissance Italy. Ibn Nubata died in his home city in 984/5.

Works
His sermons were written in rhyming prose and, according to the historian Marius Canard, followed a three-section pattern: "(1) praise of God and prayer for the Prophet; (2) exhortation to fear God and the Last Judgement and to observe the moral and religious laws, in particular the obligation of the jihad; (3) petition for God's help and blessing, ending in a verse of the Qur'an". 

Apart from his regular Friday sermons, Ibn Nubata also composed sermons for special occasions, notably the campaigns of his patron, Sayf al-Dawla, against the Byzantine Empire. These 'sermons on the Holy War' were among his most popular works, and are a historical source about the political events of his day. 

The 13th-century biographer Ibn Khallikan praised him as "a perfect master of all sciences connected with general literature", as well as a person of "divine grace" and "fine genius".

His sermons were collected along with sermons of his son, Abu Tahir Muhammad, and his grandson, Abu'l-Faraj, in the 1220s. Various editions have survived, with the 1311 Beirut edition being the most famous.

References

Sources
 
 
 

984 deaths
People from the Hamdanid emirate of Aleppo
Sermon writers
People from Silvan, Turkey
Sayf al-Dawla
Islamic sermons